Kohora is a small town situated in the Golaghat district of Assam. It is the main entrance of the world-famous Kaziranga National Park. It lies on the National Highway 37(Asean Highway 1). Kohora Lies Between Nagaon And Golaghat.

Climate

The climate of Kohora is same with the world heritage site Kaziranga National Park which experiences three seasons: summer, monsoon, and winter. During this season, beels and nullahs (water channels) dry up. During this season, animals usually are found near water bodies. During the peak months of July and August, three-fourths of the western region of the town is submerged, due to the rising water level of the Brahmaputra. The flooding causes at the north side of the town where, most animals to migrate to elevated and forested regions outside the southern border of the national park, such as the Mikir hills.540 animals, including 13 rhinos and mostly hog deers perished in unprecedented devastating floods of 2012. However, occasional dry spells create problems as well, such as food shortages for the wildlife in the park.

Tourist Complex

Kohora is the main entrance to the world heritage site Kaziranga, so that there are many resorts, hotels and guest houses for tourists. The all tourist facilities are available at an areal distance which is known as Kaziranga Tourist Complex or similarly Kohora Tourist Complex. It covers a distance of minimum 10 kilometers along the National Highway 37 and about 1 kilometer to the south of the town (central).

Schools

Colleges

Road

Kohora is connected with National Highway 37 therefore it connects with all the major cities of Assam (Guwahati, Jorhat, Nagaon, Tezpur, Sivasagar, Dibrugarh). There are several bus stoppage nearby the highway.

Transport

Due to its location near the National Highway 37 bus service and local transportation is available at Kohora. Minibus service connects Jorhat, Tezpur, Nagaon, Golaghat. And Super buses connects Guwahati, Jorhat, Nagaon, Sivasagar, Digboi, Tinisukia, Doomdooma, Jagun, Imphal (NH39), Golaghat (NH39), Dimapur (NH39). Local transport service connects Bokakhat and Kohora.

Market and Departmental Stores

 Arranya Market, Kohora.
 Daily Market (Bazaar), Kohora.
 Kaziranga Hand-loom, Kohora
 Bogorijuri Tiniali, Kohora
 Retail Organic Tea Outlet, Kohora
 Kohora Fish Market, Kohora
 Rana Mobile Repairing Centre, Bogorijuri, Kohora
 Rana General Store, Bogorijuri, Kohora

Banks and ATMs

 State Bank Of India, Kohora Branch
 SBI ATM, Near SBI, Kohora

Mail and Courier Services

 Kaziranga National Park Post Office, Near BSNL, Kohora

Notes

Cities and towns in Golaghat district
Golaghat district